Werauhia pectinata is a plant species in the genus Werauhia. This species is native to Mexico.

References

pectinata
Flora of Mexico